The Church of the Resurrection is an Armenian Apostolic church in the city of Rostov-on-Don, Russia.

Description 
According to 2010 census data, Rostov-on-Don has a population of 41 550 Armenians, which is 3.4% of total city's population.

The construction of the Church of the Resurrection began in October 2005. In 2011 it was finished and the church was consecrated on May 29, 2011 by Catholicos Karekin II.

The church was built in the traditions of Armenian religious architecture. Its total height with the dome is about 40 meters. The building can accommodate about 300 parishioners.
Walls inside and outside were stuffed with pink tuff which was specially brought from Armenia. The altar and baptistery were made by Armenian masons of white marble with multi-layered carvings. The walls inside are not painted. On the ceiling there is a large chandelier. A gilded cross is erected on top of the building.

In front of the church there are two khachkar stones on both sides of the front door. Khachkars were made of pink tuff and were installed in honor of friendship between Russian and Armenian peoples.

References

2011 establishments in Russia
Churches in Rostov-on-Don